Bruno Kessler (17 February 1924, in Peio – 19 March 1991, in Trento) was an Italian politician. He served as President of the Autonomous Province of Trento from 1960 to 1973. He was the father of Giovanni Kessler.

In 1962 he founded the Istituto Trentino di Cultura (now Fondazione Bruno Kessler), which gave rise to the University of Trento.

Biography 
In 1943 he obtained his classical maturity at Rovereto and in 1950 graduated in Law from the University of Padua.

He was president of the Autonomous Province of Trento from 1960 to 1974. In 1962 he founded the "Trentino Institute of Culture", the first core of the University of Trento. The Faculty of Sociology was the first of its kind in Italy. He supported the 1972 Autonomy Statute and the Provincial Urban Plan. He was also elected in the Senate in 1983 and 1987. He died in 1991 during the X Legislature and later replaced by Alberto Robol.

In 2007 the Trentino Institute of Culture became the Bruno Kessler Foundation (FBK).

External links
 Biography

1924 births
1991 deaths
Presidents of Trentino
Presidents of Trentino-Alto Adige/Südtirol
Christian Democracy (Italy) politicians
University of Padua alumni